is a Japanese voice actor from Otawara, Tochigi who is represented by Aoni Production. He is best known for the roles of Softon in Bobobo-bo Bo-bobo, Tamahome in Fushigi Yûgi, Seiran Shi in Saiunkoku Monogatari, Gridman in Gridman the Hyper Agent, Heero Yuy in Mobile Suit Gundam Wing, Kaede Rukawa in Slam Dunk, Ayato Sakamaki in Diabolik Lovers, Rantaro Amami in Danganronpa V3: Killing Harmony, Zelgadis Greywords in Slayers, Ryuho in s-CRY-ed, Ein/Hayate from the Dead or Alive series, Marth from the Fire Emblem series, Akihiko Sanada from Persona 3, Lancer from Fate/Zero, Kyōsuke Natsume from Little Busters!, Sakamoto from Haven't You Heard? I'm Sakamoto, Zora Ideale from Black Clover, Kouga from Saint Seiya Omega, Ensign Nogami from The Cockpit, Garou from One-Punch Man, Cherry Blossom from SK8 the Infinity, and Lilia Vanrouge from Disney: Twisted-Wonderland.

Profile

Hikaru Midorikawa debuted as a voice actor in 1988 with his role as Murai from Be-Bop High School. He is one of the most well-known and prolific voice actors in Japan, with more than 200 anime credits and close to 70 game credits in his two-decade career. He is known for voicing bishounen characters, such as Lancer in Fate/Zero, Kyōsuke Natsume in Little Busters! and Little Busters! Refrain, Eiichi Ōtori in Uta no☆Prince-sama♪ Maji Love 2000%, Rukawa Kaede in Slam Dunk, Ayato Sakamaki in Diabolik Lovers, and Edgar Ashenbert in Earl and Fairy. He has also voiced Tsunagu Hakamada (aka Best Jeanist) in My Hero Academia and Vidaldus Taka in Fairy Tail.

Hikaru Midorikawa is also a J-Pop artist and was a member in several bands including as Zero Phoenix and E.M.U. (Entertainment Music Unit) from the mid 1990s until the early 2000s. E.M.U. was formed by five voice actors from the radio drama Sotsugyou M (Male Graduation). The other members are Nobutoshi Canna (previously Hayashi), Ryōtarō Okiayu, Hideo Ishikawa, and Daisuke Sakaguchi. During their run from 1995 to 2000, the group released 8 CDs and four singles. Shortly before E.M.U. disbanded, Hikaru Midorikawa joined his fellow voice actor and friend, Nobutoshi Canna, to create a new group, Zero Phoenix. The duo released one CD, titled "Kirameki".

His voice ranges between E2 and A4 (slightly B4). While singing, he ranges between C or D.

Hikaru Midorikawa manages his own blog and is an avid gamer. He is a big fan of Super Robot Wars, having a blog entry on the SRW site; he is one of a few of people to have a blog on Banpresto's "Supalog" website. As a SRW fan, Midorikawa does extra lines for his characters for free and sometimes acts as a beta tester for new games in the franchise. Usually the characters he is cast to play turn into one-man armies, namely Heero and Masaki in Super Robot Wars and Xingke in Code Geass.

Filmography

Anime

Film

Drama CDs

Video games

Tokusatsu

Dubbing

Live-action

Animation

References

External links
  
  
 
 Hikaru Midorikawa at GamePlaza-Haruka Voice Acting Database 
 Hikaru Midorikawa at Hitoshi Doi's Seiyuu Database
 

1968 births
Living people
Aoni Production voice actors
Fire Emblem
Japanese male video game actors
Japanese male voice actors
Male voice actors from Tochigi Prefecture
20th-century Japanese male actors
21st-century Japanese male actors